Sam van der Ven (born 5 September 1989) is a Dutch field hockey player who plays as a goalkeeper for HGC and the Dutch national team.

International career
Van der Ven made his debut for the Dutch national team in a test match against Belgium in 2014. He was a part of the Dutch squad which won the silver medal at the 2018 World Cup. In June 2019, he was selected as the joint first goalkeeper in the Netherlands squad for the 2019 EuroHockey Championship. They won the bronze medal by defeating Germany 4–0.

References

External links
 

1989 births
Living people
Sportspeople from Voorburg
Dutch male field hockey players
Male field hockey goalkeepers
2018 Men's Hockey World Cup players
HGC players
Men's Hoofdklasse Hockey players